Cobalt nitrate can refer to:

Cobalt(II) nitrate and its several hydrates
Cobalt(III) nitrate, a diamagnetic volatile compound